Francis Odega  is a Nigerian comic actor best known for a hilarious video clip of him that went viral and circulated on the Internet. It brought him to the limelight as he secured endorsement deals and recognition from foreign celebrities, an example is 50 cent, who Odega claimed followed him on Instagram

Education and career
Francis holds a bachelor's degree in Economics after graduating from Ambrose Alli University. He is one of the pioneering comedians of the popular Night Of A Thousand Laughs comedy show. In 2013, Francis won the "Best Actor" award alongside Hlomla Dandala in the "Best African Collaboration" category at the 2013 Ghana Movie Awards. Francis came into the limelight after a scene from the movie series Back From South Africa hit the internet with notable people like 50 Cent and Tinie Tempah sharing the video clip of the scene on Instagram. The scene captures him comically speaking in an American accent.

Selected filmography

Films
Back From South Africa
House of Gold
Baby Police
How Far?
Romeo Without Juliet
Money For Hand
Osuofia in London
My Last Wedding
Campus Cult

Soaps
Clinic Matters

Endorsement
After the video clip went viral, Francis signed an endorsement deal with telecommunications company Etisalat as its brand ambassador.

References

External links

Living people
Male actors from Delta State
Ambrose Alli University alumni
Nigerian male film actors
20th-century Nigerian male actors
21st-century Nigerian male actors
Nigerian male comedians
Year of birth missing (living people)
Nigerian male television actors
Nigerian media personalities
20th-century births